The first lady of the United States (FLOTUS) is the title held by the hostess of the White House, usually the wife of the president of the United States, concurrent with the president's term in office. Although the first lady's role has never been codified or officially defined, she figures prominently in the political and social life of the United States. Since the early 20th century, the first lady has been assisted by official staff, now known as the Office of the First Lady and headquartered in the East Wing of the White House.

Jill Biden is the current first lady of the United States, as wife of the 46th and current president of the United States, Joe Biden.

While the title was not in general use until much later, Martha Washington, the wife of George Washington, the first U.S. president (1789–1797), is considered to be the inaugural first lady of the United States. During her lifetime, she was often referred to as "Lady Washington".

Since the 1900s, the role of first lady has changed considerably. It has come to include involvement in political campaigns, management of the White House, championship of social causes, and representation of the president at official and ceremonial occasions. 

As first ladies now typically publish their memoirs, which are viewed as potential sources of additional information about their husbands' administrations, and because the public is interested in these increasingly independent women in their own right, first ladies frequently remain a focus of attention long after their husbands' terms of office have ended. Additionally, over the years individual first ladies have held influence in a range of sectors, from fashion to public opinion on policy, as well as advocacy for female empowerment. Historically, should a president be unmarried or a widower the president usually asks a relative to act as White House hostess.

Origins of the title 

The use of the title First Lady to describe the spouse or hostess of an executive began in the United States. In the early days of the republic, there was not a generally accepted title for the wife of the president. Many early first ladies expressed their own preference for how they were addressed, including the use of such titles as "Lady", "Mrs. President" and "Mrs. Presidentress"; Martha Washington was often referred to as "Lady Washington". One of the earliest uses of the term "First Lady" was applied to her in an 1838 newspaper article that appeared in the St. Johnsbury Caledonian, the author, "Mrs. Sigourney", discussing how Martha Washington had not changed, even after her husband George became president. She wrote that "The first lady of the nation still preserved the habits of early life. Indulging in no indolence, she left the pillow at dawn, and after breakfast, retired to her chamber for an hour for the study of the scriptures and devotion."

According to a legend, Dolley Madison was referred to as first lady in 1849 at her funeral in a eulogy delivered by President Zachary Taylor; however, no written record of this eulogy exists, nor did any of the newspapers of her day refer to her by that title. Sometime after 1849, the title began being used in Washington, D.C., social circles. The first person to have the title applied to her while she was actually holding the office was Harriet Lane, the niece of James Buchanan; Leslie's Illustrated Newspaper used the phrase to describe her in an 1860 article about her duties as White House hostess. Another of the earliest known written examples comes from November 3, 1863, diary entry of William Howard Russell, in which he referred to gossip about "the First Lady in the Land", referring to Mary Todd Lincoln. The title first gained nationwide recognition in 1877, when newspaper journalist Mary C. Ames referred to Lucy Webb Hayes as "the First Lady of the Land" while reporting on the inauguration of Rutherford B. Hayes. The frequent reporting on Lucy Hayes' activities helped spread use of the title outside Washington. A popular 1911 comedic play about Dolley Madison by playwright Charles Nirdlinger, titled The First Lady in the Land, popularized the title further. By the 1930s, it was in wide use. Use of the title later spread from the United States to other nations.

When Edith Wilson took control of her husband's schedule in 1919 after he had a debilitating stroke, one Republican senator labeled her "the Presidentress who had fulfilled the dream of the suffragettes by changing her title from First Lady to Acting First Man".

According to the Nexis database, the abbreviation FLOTUS (pronounced ) was first used in 1983 by Donnie Radcliffe, writing in The Washington Post.

Non-spouses in the role 
Several women (at least thirteen) who were not presidents' wives have served as first lady, as when the president was a bachelor or widower, or when the wife of the president was unable to fulfill the duties of the first lady herself. In these cases, the position has been filled by a female relative of the president, such as Jefferson's daughter Martha Jefferson Randolph, Jackson's daughter-in-law Sarah Yorke Jackson and his wife's niece Emily Donelson, Taylor's daughter Mary Elizabeth Bliss, Benjamin Harrison's daughter Mary Harrison McKee, Buchanan's niece Harriet Lane, and Cleveland's sister Rose Cleveland.

Potential male title 
Each of the 46 presidents of the United States have been male, all of whom have either had their wives, or a female hostess, assume the role of first lady. Thus, a male equivalent for the title of first lady has never been needed. However, in 2016, as Hillary Clinton became the first woman to win a major party's presidential nomination, questions were raised as to what her husband Bill would be titled if she were to win the presidency. During the campaign, the title of First Gentleman of the United States was most frequently suggested for Bill Clinton, although as a former president himself, he may be called "Mr. President". In addition, state governors' male spouses are typically called the First Gentleman of their respective state (for example, Michael Haley was the first gentleman of South Carolina while his wife, Nikki, served as governor). Ultimately, Hillary Clinton lost the election, rendering this a moot point.

In 2021, Kamala Harris became the first woman to hold a nationally elected office when she took office as vice president, making her husband Doug Emhoff the first male spouse of a nationally elected officeholder. Emhoff assumed the title of Second Gentleman of the United States ("gentleman" replacing "lady" in the title) making it likely that any future male spouse of a president will be given the title of first gentleman.

Role 

The position of the first lady is not an elected one and carries only ceremonial duties. Nonetheless, first ladies have held a highly visible position in American society. The role of the first lady has evolved over the centuries. She is, first and foremost, the hostess of the White House. She organizes and attends official ceremonies and functions of state either along with, or in place of, the president. Lisa Burns identifies four successive main themes of the first ladyship: as public woman (1900–1929); as political celebrity (1932–1961); as political activist (1964–1977); and as political interloper (1980–2001).

Martha Washington created the role and hosted many affairs of state at the national capital (New York and Philadelphia). This socializing became known as the Republican Court and provided elite women with opportunities to play backstage political roles. Both Martha Washington and Abigail Adams were treated as if they were "ladies" of the British royal court.

Dolley Madison popularized the first ladyship by engaging in efforts to assist orphans and women, by dressing in elegant fashions and attracting newspaper coverage, and by risking her life to save iconic treasures during the War of 1812. Madison set the standard for the ladyship and her actions were the model for nearly every first lady until Eleanor Roosevelt in the 1930s. Roosevelt traveled widely and spoke to many groups, often voicing personal opinions to the left of the president's. She authored a weekly newspaper column and hosted a radio show. Jacqueline Kennedy led an effort to redecorate and restore the White House.

Many first ladies became significant fashion trendsetters. Some have exercised a degree of political influence by virtue of being an important adviser to the president.

Over the course of the 20th century, it became increasingly common for first ladies to select specific causes to promote, usually ones that are not politically divisive. It is common for the first lady to hire a staff to support these activities. Lady Bird Johnson pioneered environmental protection and beautification. Pat Nixon encouraged volunteerism and traveled extensively abroad; Betty Ford supported women's rights; Rosalynn Carter aided those with mental disabilities; Nancy Reagan founded the Just Say No drug awareness campaign; Barbara Bush promoted literacy; Hillary Clinton sought to reform the healthcare system in the U.S.; Laura Bush supported women's rights groups, and encouraged childhood literacy. Michelle Obama became identified with supporting military families and tackling childhood obesity; and Melania Trump used her position to help children, including prevention of cyberbullying and support for those whose lives are affected by drugs.

Since 1964, the incumbent and all living former first ladies are honorary members of the board of trustees of the National Cultural Center, the John F. Kennedy Center for the Performing Arts.

Near the end of her husband's presidency, Clinton became the first first lady to seek political office, when she ran for United States Senate. During the campaign, her daughter Chelsea took over much of the first lady's role. Victorious, Clinton served as junior senator from New York from 2001 to 2009, when she resigned to become President Obama's secretary of state. Later, she was the Democratic Party nominee for president in the 2016 election, but lost to Donald Trump.

Office of the First Lady 

The Office of the First Lady of the United States is accountable to the first lady for her to carry out her duties as hostess of the White House, and is also in charge of all social and ceremonial events of the White House. The first lady has her own staff that includes a chief of staff, press secretary, White House Social Secretary, and Chief Floral Designer. The Office of the First Lady is an entity of the White House Office, a branch of the Executive Office of the President. When First Lady Hillary Clinton decided to pursue a run for Senator of New York, she set aside her duties as first lady and moved to Chappaqua, New York, to establish state residency. She resumed her duties as first lady after winning her senatorial campaign, and retained her duties as both first lady and a U.S. senator for the seventeen-day overlap before Bill Clinton's term came to an end.

Exhibitions and collections 
Established in 1912, the First Ladies Collection has been one of the most popular attractions at the Smithsonian Institution. The original exhibition opened in 1914 and was one of the first at the Smithsonian to prominently feature women. Originally focused largely on fashion, the exhibition now delves deeper into the contributions of first ladies to the presidency and American society. In 2008, "First Ladies at the Smithsonian" opened at the National Museum of American History as part of its reopening year celebration. That exhibition served as a bridge to the museum's expanded exhibition on first ladies' history that opened on November 19, 2011. "The First Ladies" explores the unofficial but important position of first lady and the ways that different women have shaped the role to make their own contributions to the presidential administrations and the nation. The exhibition features 26 dresses and more than 160 other objects, ranging from those of Martha Washington to Michelle Obama, and includes White House china, personal possessions and other objects from the Smithsonian's unique collection of first ladies' materials.

Fashion influence 
Some first ladies have garnered attention for their dress and style. Jacqueline Kennedy Onassis, for instance, became a global fashion icon: her style was copied by commercial manufacturers and imitated by many young women, and she was named to the International Best Dressed List Hall of Fame in 1965. Mamie Eisenhower was named one of the twelve best-dressed women in the country by the New York Dress Institute every year that she was First Lady. The "Mamie Look" involved a full-skirted dress, charm bracelets, pearls, little hats, and bobbed, banged hair. Michelle Obama also received significant attention for her fashion choices: style writer Robin Givhan praised her in The Daily Beast, arguing that the First Lady's style had helped to enhance the public image of the office.

Causes and initiatives 

Since the 1920s, many first ladies have become public speakers, adopting specific causes. It also became common for the First Lady to hire a staff to support her agenda. Recent causes of the First Lady are:

 Eleanor Roosevelt; Women's rights, civil rights, and humanitarian efforts 
 Jacqueline Kennedy; White House restoration and the Arts 
 Lady Bird Johnson; Environmental protection and Beautification 
 Pat Nixon; Volunteerism 
 Betty Ford; Women's rights, Substance abuse 
 Rosalynn Carter; Mental health 
 Nancy Reagan; "Just Say No", drug awareness 
 Barbara Bush; Childhood literacy 
 Hillary Clinton; Healthcare in the United States 
 Laura Bush; Childhood literacy 
 Michelle Obama; "Let's Move!"; reducing childhood obesity 
 Michelle Obama; “Let Girls Learn”; increasing education for girls
 Melania Trump; "Be Best"; cyberbullying awareness
 Jill Biden; "Joining Forces"; military families

See also 
 First Ladies: Influence & Image
 First Ladies National Historic Site (Canton, Ohio)
 First Spouse $1 Coin Program
 List of current United States first spouses
 Second ladies and gentlemen of the United States
 Lewis L. Gould, pioneer scholar on the topic

References

Further reading 

 Abrams, Jeanne E. . First Ladies of the Republic: Martha Washington, Abigail Adams, Dolley Madison, and the Creation of an Iconic American Role. New York New York University Press, 2018. .
  excerpt and text search
  Curriculum unit based on primary sources.
  Popular essays by scholars.
 
 
 Caroli, Betty Boyd. "The Role of First Lady" in Graff, Henry F., ed. The presidents: A Reference History (3rd ed. 2002)
 
 Gould, Lewis L. "First Lady as Catalyst: Lady Bird Johnson and Highway Beautification in the 1960s". Environmental Review 10.2 (1986): 77–92. online
 Gould, Lewis L. Lady Bird Johnson and the Environment (UP Kansas, 1988) online
 Gould, Lewis L. Helen Taft: Our Musical First Lady (UP Kansas, 2010).
 Gould, Lewis L. Edith Kermit Roosevelt: Creating the Modern First Lady (2012) online

 Hummer, Jill Abraham. First Ladies and American Women: In Politics and at Home (UP of Kansas, 2017); 269 pages;
  On media images of Michelle Obama.
  Heavily illustrated.
  excerpt and text search
 Schwartz, Marie Jenkins. Ties That Bound: Founding First Ladies and Slaves (U of Chicago Press, 2017), 420 pp.
  By a leading political historian.
  excerpt and text search

External links 
 Alphabetical List of First Ladies of the United States
 Office of the First Lady
 First Lady's Gallery
 The National First Ladies' Library
 The First Ladies at the Smithsonian

 *